This is a list of Spanish television related events in 1987.

Events 
 Music Band La Trinca members Josep Maria Mainat and Toni Cruz create production company Gestmusic.

Debuts

Television shows

La 1

Ending this year

La 1

Foreign series debuts in Spain

Births 
 18 January - Tamara Gorro, pundit.
 31 January - Selu Nieto, actor.
 16 February - María Gómez, hostess.
 21 August - Megan Montaner, actress.
 31 October - Miguel Frigenti, pundit.
 20 November - Rodrigo Vázquez, host.

Deaths 
 30 April - Ángel Losada, host, 55
 12 July - Amelia de la Torre, actress, 82

See also
1987 in Spain
List of Spanish films of 1987

References 

1987 in Spanish television